Francis Joseph Gough (26 July 1898 – 30 January 1980) was an Australian cricketer who played first-class cricket for Queensland from 1924 to 1933.

Life and career
Frank Gough was a batsman and leg-spin bowler. In 1926-27 he played in Queensland's inaugural Sheffield Shield match, taking three wickets, including that of Archie Jackson, who was making his first-class debut. In 1927–28, he was the first bowler to dismiss Don Bradman for a duck in first-class cricket. 

After 1927-28 he played for Queensland as a batsman, although he continued to bowl effectively in Brisbane Grade Cricket, where he set a record of 242 wickets for Norths, which stood until 1950-51 when it was surpassed by Bert McGinn. He made 52 and 104 when Queensland beat the touring MCC in 1929-30. His other century was the 137 he scored against New South Wales in 1930–31. He captained Queensland from 1930–31 to 1932–33.

He married Lottie Phillips in Sydney in April 1933. In World War II he served as a flying officer in the Royal Australian Air Force from September 1942 to December 1945.

References

External links
 
 Frank Gough at CricketArchive

1898 births
1980 deaths
Cricketers from Brisbane
Australian cricketers
Queensland cricketers
Queensland cricket captains
Royal Australian Air Force personnel of World War II
Royal Australian Air Force officers